William Levi Johnson Sr. (September 14, 1926 – January 7, 2011), known as Tiger Johnson, was a professional football player and coach. He was born in Tyler, Texas, where he was raised by his single mother and five older siblings.  Among his siblings was older brother Gilbert Johnson, who played quarterback at Southern Methodist University with the iconic running back Doak Walker.  Bill was a football and baseball star for Tyler Junior College and Texas A&M University and graduated from Stephen F. Austin State University. He played center for the San Francisco 49ers from 1948 to 1956.

Although Johnson is known mostly for his accomplishments as a football player in the National Football League  (NFL), Tiger had a prolific career in college as well, not only in football, but also baseball.  Bill began his college football career at Tyler Junior College, a small school in Johnson's hometown of Tyler, Texas. Bill finished his collegiate career with Texas A&M University.  The end of his college sports career brought about a pressing issue; was Johnson to pursue a professional career in the MLB with the Cincinnati Reds, who had offered him a minor-league contract, or test his football ability in the NFL with the San Francisco 49ers, who offered Bill with a non-drafted rookie free agent contract.  Bill decided to go with football, even though his true love was baseball.  He was a phenomenal catcher at the collegiate level, but always stated that he would have never made it in "the bigs" due to a lack of ability in throwing out base runners when they would attempt to steal.

During his nine years in the NFL as a player, all of which were with the 49ers, Johnson blocked at the center position for what was known as the Million Dollar Backfield in San Francisco, which featured fullbacks John Henry Johnson and Joe Perry, halfback Hugh McElhenny, and quarterback Y. A. Tittle.  Johnson was heralded as the star of the offensive line of the 49ers, who constantly beat teams due to their ability to control the ball and wear down opponents.  Johnson earned two Pro Bowl selections, and was also voted to be an All-Pro.  Bill earned the nickname of "Tiger" in his first season as a 49er.  Johnson spent most of his rookie season injured, only seeing the field in five of the twelve regular season games.  One game, when Bill was sidelined, his teammates began to taunt him, given that Johnson was a rookie.  They were implying through teasing him that Johnson was not truly injured, but was not tough enough to play football at the professional level.  Eventually, Johnson was fed up, and retorted, "I can't wait 'til I'm back on the field – and when I come back, I'll come back fighting like a Tiger!"  The nickname "Tiger" stuck forever, and his tenacity on the field was always a prime, living contributor to his nickname's legitimacy.

He was a line coach for the Cincinnati Bengals in 1976, when Paul Brown retired as the team's head coach and named Tiger as his successor. Tiger won 18 and lost 15, but resigned five games into the 1978 season after starting 0–5. He and Marvin Lewis are the only coaches in franchise history to leave the team with a winning record. 

After his head coaching tenure, Johnson was an assistant coach for the Tampa Bay Buccaneers from 1979 to 1982 and the Detroit Lions from 1983 to 1984.  He finished his career by reuniting with the Bengals as an assistant in 1985.   He retired as the Bengals tight ends coach in 1990.

He was the father of three children, Bill, Sherilyn, and Thomas. Eldest son Bill was the former CEO of HJ Heinz.

1926 births
2011 deaths
American football centers
Cincinnati Bengals coaches
Detroit Lions coaches
San Francisco 49ers (AAFC) players
San Francisco 49ers players
Tampa Bay Buccaneers coaches
Texas A&M Aggies football players
Tyler Apaches football players
Western Conference Pro Bowl players
Sportspeople from Tyler, Texas
Cincinnati Bengals head coaches